The Andorra national handball team is the national handball team of Andorra, representing the country in international matches. It is controlled by the Andorran Handball Federation (Federació Andorrana D'handbol).

History
Andorra gained full membership to the European Handball Federation in the 11th Extraordinary EHF Congress on 29 May 2011. The men's national team played its first official match, a friendly, on 7 October 2011, hosting Ireland. 350 fans gathered together to witness the game, which was won by the visitors in the dying seconds to 30–29.

In 2015, Andorra played the IHF Emerging Nations Championship in Kosovo, where it only could win one of the six games played.

IHF Emerging Nations Championship record

IHF/EHF Trophy

References

External links
Official website
IHF profile

Men's national handball teams
Handball - Men